The Savage Land is a hidden prehistoric land appearing in American comic books published by Marvel Comics. It is a tropical preserve hidden in Antarctica. It has appeared in many story arcs in Uncanny X-Men as well as other related books.

Publication history
The Savage Land first appeared as The Land Where Time Stands Still in Marvel Mystery Comics #22 (Aug. 1941), in the tale "Khor, the Black Sorcerer" by Joe Simon, Jack Kirby, and Syd Shores.
It gained its familiar form and moniker in X-Men #10 (March 1965), courtesy of Stan Lee and Jack Kirby.

Fictional history

In the X-Men series of comics, the Savage Land was created by the alien Nuwali at the behest of the other-dimensional, nigh-omnipotent aliens known as the Beyonders who sought to observe the process of evolution under relatively controlled conditions. So, they had the Nuwali set up a number of game preserves on several planets. One of these planets was Earth during the Triassic period where the Nuwali chose a valley in Antarctica surrounded by active volcanoes. They proceeded to install a number of advanced technological devices in order to maintain a tropical climate. The aliens then stocked the area with all manner of Earth life over the following several millennia such as dinosaurs and prehistoric mammals. They also brought over the Man-Apes, earlier hominid ancestors of Homo sapiens.

The Beyonders eventually grew bored with the experiment, and the Nuwali stopped maintaining the Savage Land during the Late Pleistocene era (the Ice Age era). However, the self-maintaining technology that allowed the pocket of tropical climate was left running, and many species which became extinct in other areas of the Earth continued to thrive within the Savage Land.

Later on, a group of human survivors from Atlantis sailed to Antarctica before the "Great Cataclysm" which sank Atlantis into the ocean. There, they discovered a cavern where they found an immense climate-controlling device and harnessed the technology used to keep the Savage Land's volcanoes working. They named their location "Pangea", which is Atlantean for "paradise".

They mastered genetic engineering, which had been used on the Man-Apes when the Nuwali were still maintaining the Savage Land area. They used their genetic engineering techniques to transform other Savage Land inhabitants like the Golden People, the Lizard Men, the Reptile Men, the Tubantis, and others. The Atlanteans then forced them to work for them until these animal people revolted. After a time of war, the animal people demanded civil rights and the Atlanteans used technology to expand the Savage Land's surface area for the animal people to live in. When the Great Cataclysm struck, the Atlantean empire fell and thanks to the machines, the Savage Land locations were spared from sinking into the sea.

In more recent years, the Savage Land was rediscovered by Lord Robert Plunder, who took back a sample of the metal known as "anti-metal" or "Antarctic vibranium" with him. This mysterious metal had the ability to produce vibrations which would liquefy all other metals. Fleeing from those who sought to steal this discovery, Plunder took his eldest son Kevin with him for a second trip into the Savage Land. The elder Plunder was killed by a local tribe of Man-Apes.

Kevin survived, thanks to the timely intervention of the orphaned sabretooth tiger later known as Zabu. He grew to adulthood in the Savage Land, becoming the adventurer known as Ka-Zar. Ka-Zar had many team-ups with the X-Men, who first revealed the Savage Land's existence, Spider-Man, and many other superheroes who had visited the Savage Land. He later met and married Shanna the She-Devil.

The Savage Land's existence is common knowledge throughout the world. At one time, there were press junkets, sponsored by the oil company Roxxon. Daily Bugle photographer Peter Parker was sent and helped uncover Roxxon's unethical and dangerous manipulation of the local resources.

At one point, Spider-Man teamed up with Ka-Zar to save Gwen Stacy from Kraven the Hunter and Gog at the time when her class and J. Jonah Jameson were visiting the Savage Land.

Many villains have threatened the Savage Land, including Sauron, Garokk, Magneto, and Thanos.

The Savage Land was decimated by an evil alien named Terminus (or one of his pawns) when he destroyed the machines that maintained the tropical climate. Many of the Savage Land's native people were saved from the ensuing destruction by M'rin: The Warlord of The Skies who took them into her own native dimension to safety. Ka-Zar, Shanna, and Zabu wandered until the High Evolutionary (with help from the X-Men, M'rin, and Garokk) restored the region and its creatures, allowing them to return to the Savage Land with their newborn son. The other natives who had taken refuge in M'rin's dimension returned as well.

Sometime after that, Spider-Man had Devil Dinosaur and Moon-Boy emigrated to the Savage Land after rescuing them from Ringmaster.

Evidence in the pages of the New Avengers suggests that S.H.I.E.L.D. is operating in the Savage Land, mining vibranium while using the indigenous population as slave labor, but these operations have been classified, and the operation was apparently decimated by a missile strike from the Helicarrier during an attack by the New Avengers. The team only survived thanks to Iron Man's force field.

The Savage Land is featured in the limited series Claws, serving as a place of revenge for Wolverine and Black Cat on Arcade and White Rabbit. After defeating the two villains, the heroes left them stranded.

In X-Men: Divided We Stand, Cyclops and Emma Frost were vacationing there until Archangel contacted them about San Francisco looking like the 1960s.

Alyosha Kravinoff fled to the Savage Land after Punisher sabotaged his zoo.

During the "Secret Invasion" storyline, Ka-Zar and Shanna discover Skrulls mining for vibranium. The New Avengers and the Mighty Avengers head toward the Savage Land where a downed Skrull ship was sighted. Luke Cage opens the downed Skrull ship and a large group of Marvel superheroes with older appearances and costumes come out, speaking as if they believe themselves to be authentic. They soon break out into a fight where the Spider-Man from the ship is killed by a Tyrannosaurus and regresses to a Skrull. The Hawkeye from the ship is killed by Ronin and regresses to a Skrull. This causes the superheroes from the ship to scatter into the jungle. The New Avengers' Spider-Man is knocked away by a Tyrannosaurus and ends up confronting Ka-Zar, Shanna, Zabu, and Sauron as well as some of the other locals (ranging from the Man-Apes, the Sun People, the Swamp Men, the Tree People, and the Zebra People). At the point where Spider-Man accuses Ka-Zar and Shanna for being Skrulls, the Captain America from the ship attacks who thinks the same thing for Spider-Man. When the Captain America is hit by a dart coated in some type of poison by one of the Swamp Men, it regresses to a Skrull named Pit'o Nilli and is then killed by Shanna. The ship's Beast is trapped underground with Wonder Man. The two try to escape together, but Beast betrays Wonder Man as the two are about to return to the surface. During this, Iron Man uses an abandoned scientific facility nearby to try and recreate his original armor. When it came to the confrontation with both Avengers teams, the Savage Land natives, and the heroes from the ship, Mister Fantastic and Abigail Brand used a laser to identify the heroes from the ship as Skrulls. Ka-Zar joined the Avengers teams into fighting the Skrulls in New York while Shanna and the other Savage Land natives hunted down the remaining Skrulls hiding out in the Savage Land.

After the events of Second Coming during the Heroic Age storyline, Cyclops takes some time off to go hunting in the Savage Land during which he encounters Steve Rogers. Steve Rogers suggests to Cyclops that he brings the X-Men out of the shadows and into the light as heroes. Steve Rogers also arranges to have the president award Scott the Presidential Medal of Freedom which sways the people of San Francisco to welcome the X-Men back.

Around the same time following their defeat after the hunt for "spiders" in the Grim Hunt storyline, the Kravinoff Family are also currently residing in the Savage Land.

It is later revealed that Miek and the other Imperials and Natives from Sakaar that came back with Hulk in "World War Hulk" had settled in the Savage Land. There they constructed a village called New Imperia.

During the "Avengers vs. X-Men" storyline, Captain America ends up fighting Gambit in the Savage Land.

As part of the "Marvel NOW!" event, some of The Garden's evolution seeds had fallen into the Savage Land. While working to get it under control, the Avengers find that A.I.M. is also there where they test the extracted formula from one of the pods and tests it on their intern Dr. Jema. The formula puts a strain on Dr. Jema just as the Avengers arrive.

As part of the "All-New, All-Different Marvel", Magneto led a new team of X-Men to protect mutant-kind at all costs with their base in the Savage Land.

During the "Empyre" storyline, the Cotati have invaded the Savage Land.

Conservation status
The United Nations considers the Savage Land an international wildlife preserve and forbids any commercial exploitation of its resources. Areas of the Savage Land are tame enough that the X-Men visit for recreation, including having a vacation home there.

Points of interest
There are some famous locations in the Savage Land:

 Altar of Death – This is where the Swamp Men perform their sacrificial rituals to their gods.
 City of the Sun God – It is in ruins.
 Eternity Mountains - A mountain range near the Savage Land.
 Fallen Heights
 Gondora – A now destroyed city that resided beneath a dormant volcano. It was destroyed when the volcano erupted.
 Gorahn Sea – An inland sea, home to prehistoric marine reptiles and primitive whales.
 Naghen Island – An island in the Gorahn Sea.
 Tubanti Territory – The domain of the Tubanti.
 High Evolutionary's Citadel – Where the High Evolutionary resided when he once operated in the Savage Land.
 Lost Lake
 Mystic Mists
 New Imperia – A village inhabited by the refugees from Sakaar.
 Pangea – This is where the Atlanteans had their colony and found the Nuwali technology there.
 Athmet – A location in Pangea.
 Pteros – A location in Athmet that is the home of the Pterons.
 Atlantea – The largest territory in Pangea.
 Chotorea – A frozen region where the Snowmen live.
 Mot –  A location in Pangea.
 Shalan – A location in Pangea.
 Aerie Shalan – A city that is the home of the Aerians.
 Botor – The home of the Tree People.
 Mount Flavius – A mountain in Shalan.
 Thonos – 
 Vala Kuri - A city that is home to a tribe of Lizard Men.
 Zarhan – An artificial part of Pangea that contains Lemuria and Pandori.
 Lemuria – The domain of the Lemurans.
 Pandori – The domain of the Cat People.
 Zuvi Land –  
 Sauron's Citadel – Where Sauron resides.
 Skull Island – An island that was attacked by the Swamp Men.
 Stock Lands
 Tabarr River
 Valley of Geysers – This is where Ka-Zar, Shanna the She-Devil, and Zabu fought Gregor.
 Village of the United Tribes – The representatives of the United Tribes reside here.

Wildlife

The fauna of the Savage Lands consists of prehistoric creatures which are extinct in rest of the world. The Nuwali created the Savage Lands and stocked it with many kinds of extinct animals from the Triassic to the Pleistocene until they stopped maintaining the Savage Lands.

 Ankylosaurus – An Ankylosaurus was found dead by Ka-Zar and Zabu where they saw an arrow. Later another one attacks Ka-Zar and Zabu until Ka-Zar stabbed it with a log.
 Apatosaurus – The Apatosaurus is one of the dinosaurs that lives in the Savage Land's jungles and grasslands.
 Archaeopteryx – The Archaeopteryx is one of the dinosaurs that lives in the Savage Land's jungles.
 Arsinoitherium – An Arsinoitherium attack Shanna until she was saved by Dherk.
 Brachiosaurus – The Brachiosaurus is one of the dinosaurs that lives in the Savage Land's jungles and grasslands.
 Dimetrodon – A Dimetrodon attacked one of Ramona's men and Ka-Zar fought it.
 Dire Wolf – The Dire Wolf is one of the prehistoric mammals that lives in the Savage Land's jungles.
 Doedicurus – A Doedicurus is one of the prehistoric mammals that lives in the Savage Land's jungles.
 Elasmosaurus – An Elasmosaurus attacked Ka-Zar and he fought it in the Gorhan Sea, until it was killed by a Zeuglodon.
 Eohippus – Eohippus roam through the jungles and grasslands of the Savage Land.
 Mastodon – Ka-Zar used an ear-splitting roar to call a whole herd of Mastodons to rampage through the Swamp Men's fort.
 Nothosaurus – The Nothosaurus is one of the reptiles of that roam the Savage Land.
 Ornithomimus – The Ornithomimus is one of the dinosaurs that lives in the Savage Land's grasslands.
 Pteranodon – Several Pteranodons attacked Ka-Zar and Zabu and they fought them.
 Pterodactyl – Several Pterodactyls attacked Shanna, Ka-Zar and Zabu.
 Smilodon – Smilodon is one of the famous cats in the Savage Lands. Many of them have been hunted by the Man-Ape tribe led by Maa-Gor leaving Zabu as the only confirmed Smilodon alive.
 Stegosaurus – The Stegosaurus is one of the dinosaurs that lives in the Savage Land's jungles and grasslands.
 Styracosaurus – A female Styracosaurus attacked Ka-Zar, until he made fall off a cliff.
 Synthetoceras – The Synthetoceras is one of the prehistoric mammals that lives in the Savage Land's jungles.
 Therizinosaurus – The Therizinosaurus is one of the dinosaurs that lives in the Savage Land's jungles and grasslands.
 Triceratops – The Triceratops is one of the dinosaurs that lives in the Savage Land's jungles and grasslands.
 Tyrannosaurus – The Tyrannosaurus is among the greatest predators in the Savage Landand has attacked Ka-Zar and other Marvel heroes who had visited the Savage Land.
 Velociraptor – The Velociraptor is one of the dinosaurs that lives in the Savage Land's jungles.
 Woolly Mammoth – The Woolly Mammoth is one of the prehistoric mammals that lives in the Savage Land's jungles.
 Woolly Rhinoceros – The Woolly Rhinoceros is one of the prehistoric mammals that lives in the Savage Land's jungles.
 Zeuglodon – A Zeuglodon attacks and kills an Elasmosaurus in the Gorhan Sea.

Savage Land races
There are many types of races in the Savage Land and Pangea. The Nuwali transported primitive man now known as the Man-Apes, which unlike the rest of the world thrived until the 21st century. The next arrivals were the Ancient Atlanteans who added the region as part of their empire. They used the Nuwali technology to mutate the Man-Apes into various Beast-Men to perform certain tasks. These slaves rebelled after the great Cataclysm and made Pangea their home. Many Atlanteans remained and their descendants became the various human tribes, with some clinging to the old ways and technology but most forget and resort to more primitive hunter-gatherer societies.

Since then, the different races of the Savage Land have been sorted between the human tribes, the early hominids, the Beast-Men, and the miscellaneous. Other species include skunk-like creatures.

Among the Savage Land races are:

Human tribes
 Aerians – The Aerians are a race of avian-type Beast-Men with large feathered wings which allow them to fly. Each member has a different color of skin and matching feathers (green, blue, orange, etc.). They are located in the city of Aerie Shalan which is located on a stone pillar high above Pangea. They are ruled by a technocracy, led by a chief scientist. Their technology advanced far beyond that of human scientists because they adapted and improved upon surviving antediluvian Atlantean technology. The Aerians became the principal allies of Ka-Zar and Shanna the She-Devil in Pangea, who aided them in their war with the Pterons.
 Ape-Men – The Ape-Men consist of all the species of upright apes that developed into man. Each group lives in its own territory and has its own level of technology. The most advanced species of Ape-Man (the Neanderthals often called Man-Apes in the Savage Land) are the most dominant human race of the Savage Land and are capable of bringing down even the largest of dinosaurs.
 Awakilius – The Awakilius are a tribe of pygmies that live in the Savage Land and are descended from the immigrants that came from Africa. Ka-Zar and Shanna the She-Devil prevented the Awakilius chief from sacrificing a Lemuran.
 Bhadwuans – The Bhadwuans are a society of advanced people that live in the Savage Land that are the supposed descendants of the Atlanteans. They specialize in magic, they can fly, and they can discharge energy when they act in unison. The live in the mystical realm of Bhadwuan and watched the Earth for a millennium. Some Bhadwuans wanted to change the Savage Land's environment only for them to be stopped by Ka-Zar.
 Cat People – The Cat People (also called Pandorians) are a tribe of humans that dwell in Pandori, Pangea and in the periphery of the Lemuran society. They are a hunter-gatherer society. The Cat People worship and kill the Smilodons and other big cats that live in the Savage Land. These Cat People are not to be confused with the Cat People that are associated with Tigra.
 Cliff Forest People – The Cliff Forest People are a tribe of humans that live on a steep cliff in the Savage Land. They were allied with the Durammi against an unnamed barbarian tribe.
 Disians – The Dissians (also known as the Children of Dis) are underground yellow-skinned humanoids who are the descendants of the Dante's Crew and had bee mutated into creatures that resembled the Moloids of Subterranea. They reside in the underground city of Belasco beneath the Savage Land. Some Dissians can emit bursts of energy from their eyes.
 Durammi – The Durammi are a tribe of humans that live in a peaceful valley within the Savage Land. They were allied with the Cliff Forest People against an unnamed barbarian tribe.
 Ethereals – The Ethereals are a race of advanced humanoids that were genetically enhanced by the Nuwali thousands of years ago. Until recently, they were considered to be mythical by the other tribes of the Savage Land. They are culturally arrogant and hostile to outsiders.
 Fall People – The Fall People are a hunter-gatherer tribe that live in villages, and are led by a chieftain. Their appearance and culture were similar to the Native Americans. Ka-Zar was very friendly with the Fall People, and their chieftain Tongah was his best friend. Most of the Fall People were killed in attacks by the Sun People and the extraterrestrial Quarlians. The Fall People later befriended the X-Men. The Fall People are a strong faction in the United Tribes.
 Golden People – The Golden People are a race of yellow-skinned humans that reside in the Savage Land. They are the descendants of the Gortokians of Subterranea. They are longtime allies of Ka-Zar and have salvaged Atlantean technology.
 Gondorans – The Gondorans are a tribe of humans that inhabit Gondora, a city in a dormant volcano. It was ruled by a God-Man whose actual name was Montgomery Ford, a rogue scientist from the outside world. He used technology to build the city and rule with an iron fist. Gondora has been destroyed with some of its inhabitants escaping.
 Gorankians – The Gorankians are a race of gray-skinned, ape-like, semi-intelligent, Beast-Men with small tusks coming from their lower jaw, pointed ears, and surprisingly small amount of hair. They are tribal in nature and led by Etuban. The Gorankians are a hunter-gatherer society and are long-time enemies of the Uruburians. Ka-Zar helped settle their dispute by having them play different games which includes baseball in order to prevent an all-out war.
 Gwundas – The Gwundas are a race of primitive humans that live in the Savage Land. They are a hunter-gatherer society. Ka-Zar once saved their tribe from a Tyrannosaurus that they accidentally unleashed.
 Hauk'kas – The Hauk'kas are a race of Saurians that evolved from dinosaurs the same time way that humanity has evolved from apes. The Hauk'kas possess technology, culture, and civilization that rivals the human race. The Hauk'kas have a good knowledge of the superhuman side of the human race. A council of older Saurians serve as the leaders of the Hauk'kas. The X-Men first encountered the Hauk'kas when investigating the mysterious resurrection of Psylocke at the same time when the Hauk'kas were capturing the Saurians that the X-Men once helped to emigrate to the Savage Land. The Hauk'kas are currently on neutral terms with the human race.
 Hill-Forest People – The Hill-Forest People are a race of primitive humans that live in the Savage Land. They are an agricultural tribe when they stumbled upon a capsule containing Grond of Gondwanaland (who was placed in suspended animation by his creators). The Hill-Forest People worshiped the capsule until Grond woke up and was defeated by Ka-Zar.
 Jeriens – The Jeriens are a race of Pterosaur-like Beast-Men that live in the Savage Land.
 Kantos – The Kantos are a race of primitive humans that live near an underground river.
 Karems – The Karems are a race of primitive humans that live in the Savage Land. They are a hunter-gatherer society. Many of the Karem were abducted by the Nuwali and Plunderer using the Motyka Bone (a teleportation bone that was lost for centuries), but were rescued by Ka-Zar and Shanna the She-Devil.
 Klantorrs – The Klantorrs are a race of Saurian-like Beast-Men with Pterosaur-like wings that inhabit the forest-country surrounding Palandor. They have a taste for human flesh. Possibly resulted from the genetic tinkering of the ancient Atlanteans just like the genetic tinkering that resulted in the creations of the Aerians and Pterons. They have occasionally hunted the Palandorians.
 Lemurans – The Lemurans are a society of humans that inhabit Lemura, an area of the section of Pangea known as Zarhan. Their level of technology is the same as Medieval England and are one of the descendants of the ancient Atlanteans. These humans are strongly loyal to their monarchy. The Lemurans were longtime allies of the Pterons.
 Lizard Men – The Lizard Man are a lizard-like race that were one of the Beast-Men created by the Ancient Atlanteans. There had been two different Lizard Men that lived in the Savage Land where they are much different from the Lizard Men of Subterranea and the Lizard Men of Tok (from the Microverse).
 Lizard Men of Vala Kuri – The first group of Lizard Men are a hunter-gatherer society of Beast-Men with pointy ears and reside in the city of Vala Kuri. The Lizard Men of Vala Kuri are peaceful in nature. They are protected from the Sun People by Ka-Zar and Garokk. The Lizard Men have ancestors in the Reptile Men and the Waidians.
 Queen Iranda's Lizard Men – The second group of the Lizard Men were actually a group of mystically-altered humans that went missing from their village and turned into Lizard Men by Queen Iranda. When Ka-Zar comes to their aid, he barely escapes them and manages to escape with Queen Iranda's crown which regressed Queen Iranda back to a lizard and the Lizard Men back to their human forms.
 Locot – The Locots are a society of hunter-gatherers that have been at war with the Noweks.
 Man-Apes – The Man-Apes are tribal, highly primitive cave-dwelling humans that is also known as Neanderthals by scientists. These savage hominids were the first humanoid beings native to Earth to inhabit the Savage Land. Atlantean scientists used Man-Apes as subjects in the experiments by which they created the various non-human races of the Savage Land. The members of the Man-Ape known as Maa-Gor's tribe are said to have been the last living Man-Apes in the Savage Land. Ka-Zar killed all the male Man-Apes of Maa-Gor's tribe except for Maa-Gor himself. It seems likely that the Man-Apes are the only remaining humanoids on Earth that haven't had their genome tampered with, like the other races in Savage Land or like the humans in the outside world were experimented with by the Celestials. During the "Secret Invasion" storyline, some of the Man-Apes joined Ka-Zar in his fight against the Skrulls.
 N'Galans – The N'Galans are dinosaur-like Beast-Men with possible links to the Lizard Men of Vala Kuri and are a hunter-gatherer society. Most are highly superstitious. Kraven the Hunter's trainer Gregor forced the N'Galans to work for him when he served the interests of Pillard in the Savage Land.
 Neo-Men – The Neo-Men are a society of mutated humans that were mutated by Nuwali technology.
 Nhu'Gari – The Nhu'Gari are a race of mutated humans with winged forms. They were actually altered by the radioactive properties of Hidden Valley which also provides them with telepathy. The Nhu'Gari once allied with Magneto. Their city was later destroyed by volcanic upheavals.
 Nowek – The Noweks are a society of hunters and gatherers that have been at war against the tribes that are less developed.
 Palandorians – The Palandorians are a tribe of humans that live on an island surrounded by a lake in the original Savage Land. They live in the city of Palandor and ride giant lizards. Their culture likely derives form ancient Atlantis (same as the Lemurans). The Palandorians were often preyed upon by the Klantorrs. During the reign of Queen Omel, the Palandorians performed human sacrifices which ceased when a mutated Apatosaurus destroyed the temple which killed Queen Omel.
 Pterons – The Pterons are a race of Beast-Men that greatly resemble humanoid Pteranodons and have the ability to fly with their enormous wings. They inhabit the caverns of Athmeth beneath Pangea. They are ruled by their king Khalf. The Pterons launched a war against the Aerians which ended with the deaths of much of the Pteron race in a cave-in.
 Reptile Men – The Reptile Men are a race of green-skinned Saurians that reside in the marshes of the Savage Land. They are a hunter-gatherer society. When the alien Quor crash-landed on Earth and encountered the Reptile Men, he convinced them to make him their leader and provided them with advanced technology. The Reptile Men started to plunder the Vibranium deposits of the other tribes like the Golden People which attracted the attention of Ka-Zar. Once Ka-Zar managed to defeat Quor with the help of the Golden People, the Reptile Men retreated.
 Rock Tribe – The Rock Tribe are a group of stone-like humanoids.
 Saurians – The Saurians (also known as "The People") were originally lizards that were exposed to the first nuclear bomb test in New Mexico. It took them awhile for them to evolve and they built an underground city. They did have an encounter with Ms. Marvel when she discovered their underground city. When the Dire Wraiths attacked, the Saurians encountered Rom. The Saurian survivors hid from the humans until they later learned of the Savage Land. The Saurians were spotted by some people when traveling through Argentina and were rescued by the X-Men who helped them get to the Savage Land. They became part of the United Tribes at the time when the Savage Land Mutates attacked. Sometime later, the Saurians were captured by the Hauk'ka yet were rescued by the X-Men.
 Snowmen – The Snowmen lived on the high steppes of Pangea and resemble brown-furred Yeti-like creatures. They are a hunter-gatherer society. Ka-Zar and Shanna the She-Devil encountered two of them channeling the lava from Mt. Flavius.
 Sun People – The Sun People control the Sun Empire, formerly ruled by their priestess-queen Zaladane. They were the most powerful grouping of sentient beings within the Savage Land, and they established a small empire through conquest. They conquered in the name of their sun god Garokk. Although the Sun People were depicted as green-skinned in The Official Handbook of the Marvel Universe #19 (Dec. 1987), they are in fact indistinguishable from ordinary Caucasians (see Zaladane). The cited Handbook entry in fact erroneously depicted a Sheenarian, member of an extradimensional race who once invaded the Savage Land (first seen in Ka-Zar: Lord of the Hidden Jungle #14). During the "Secret Invasion" storyline, the Sun People were depicted among Ka-Zar's allies in his fight against the Skrulls, presumably as a result of the aforementioned error being used as reference.
 Swamp Men – The Swamp Men are humanoids covered head to toe in hair that live in the swamplands of the Savage Land. These tribal people have a level of technology comparable to that of Europe's Dark Ages, ride giant birds, and are highly skilled in devising weaponry. They are continual enemies of Ka-Zar. The Swamp Men long worshipped Umbu the Unliving, a gigantic robot constructed by the alien Saggitarians. The Savage Land Mutates are Swamp Men who Magneto subjected to mutation by artificial means. During the "Secret Invasion" storyline, some of the Swamp Men joined Ka-Zar in his fight against the Skrulls.
 Sylandans – The Sylandans are a society of humans that are one of the descendants of the ancient Atlanteans. They live in Sylanda, a city of glass located in the Savage Land's Mountain of Darkness. They cling to their Atlantean ways as their level of technology is high. The Sylandans use the Water of Life to cure all diseases and used it to treat the people of the Savage Land for centuries. Their city was later damaged by a large dinosaur.
 Tandar-Kaans – The Tandar-Kaans are a tribe of people that live in the Savage Land. They are expert ship builders and fishermen. They formed a community of barges on the river Tabar allowing them to move to new shores when they want to.
 Tokchis – The Tokchis have not yet been seen in the comics yet have been mentioned a lot. They are mentioned to be a human society of hunters and gatherers that use walkie-talkies. Ka-Zar formed an alliance with them to coordinate efforts to hunt.
 Tordon-Naans – The Tordon-Naans inhabit a city called Tordon-Naa in a secluded valley deep in the Savage Land behind the "curtain of gods' tears". They worship the god Ilaka-Aron and their beliefs were manipulated Sylitha who sought greater power. The Tordon-Naans are a lost Hindu colony as their culture closely resembles that of ancient India.
 Tree People – The Tree People are a race of Beast-Men that looks much like humans though they have long, prehensile monkey-like tails. They live in Botor (a treetop village in Pangea) and are a hunter-gatherer society. Shanna the She-Devil was briefly married to one of the Tree People named Mele. During the "Secret Invasion" storyline, some of the Tree People joined Ka-Zar in his fight against the Skrulls.
 Tribe of Fire – The Tribe of Fire is a tribe of humans that live in the Savage Land. They are a hunter-gatherer society. Some of the tribe members were used in an experiment conducted by an Apocalypse robot until it was destroyed by Wolverine. The cyborgs from these experiments joined the Tribe of Fire.
 Tubanti – The Tubantis are a race of fish-type Beast-Men that dwell in Pangea's inland Gorahn Sea. They briefly served the demon Belasco when he tried to conquer the Savage Land. The Tubantis are allies with the Lemurans and the other races of the Savage Land.
 Uruburians – The Uruburians are a race of Beast-Men with unspecified feline-like faces and fangs that live in the Savage Land as a hunter-gatherer tribe. The Uruburians are long-time enemies of the Gorankians. Ka-Zar helped settle their dispute by having them play different games which includes baseball in order to prevent an all-out war.
 Waidians – The Waidians are a race of green-skinned dinosaur-like Beast-Men that live in the Savage Land. They are a hunter-gatherer society and are very peaceful. When Ka-Zar was a teenager, he was trained by the wise Waidian sage named Benazu.
 Water People – The Water People are a tribe of humans that live in the Savage Land. They are a hunter-gatherer society that live close to the rivers where they survive by fishing.
 Zebra People – The Zebra People are swamp dwellers and are also known as the Swamp Tribe. They are a racially integrated society made of up both white and black people, who wear makeup over their body in the form of zebra-like stripes. White Zebra People wear black stripes and black Zebra People wear white stripes. The Zebra People are known to ride dinosaurs that they have domesticated. During the "Secret Invasion" storyline, some of the Zebra People joined Ka-Zar in his fight against the Skrulls.
 Lizard People – There is also a rogue faction of the Zebra People called the Lizard People which wore reptilian armor and worked for Zaur and Sheeas the Witch. Zaur and those that were members of the Lizard People returned to the Zebra People after the death of Sheeas the Witch. Of course, some of them may have preserved the traditions of the Lizard People.

Other versions

Squirrel Girl volume 8
In Squirrel Girl reality, the Savage Land was created by an unknown race of aliens that created dinosaurs as an experiment on earth biology. Eventually, the experiment was eventually abandoned, and all dinosaurs, except the ones in the Savage Land. In modern times, it belongs to scientists, who protect it as a Nature Reserve. The Savage Land harbors no other intelligent creatures, except Ultron, who has rebuilt himself, and resides in the Savage Land.

Age of Apocalypse
In the Age of Apocalypse reality, the Savage Land houses Avalon, a secret haven for humans and mutants. A method to reach it exists, but it will only cost the refugee everything they own and even then, there is no guarantee of arriving alive. It is led by Destiny, a pacifist Juggernaut and Douglas Ramsey, the latter of whom provides a field that allows everybody to understand each other despite speaking different languages. Avalon was eventually found by Apocalypse forces and destroyed by the Shadow King who mind-controlled its inhabitants into killing each other. He was defeated, but casualties were high.

Age of Ultron
During the "Age of Ultron" storyline, the superhero resistance against Ultron had relocated to the Savage Land to come up with a plan to defeat Ultron.

Marvel Zombies Return
In Marvel Zombies Return, the Savage Land, like everywhere else on Earth, has been eaten by the superhuman zombies, with the surviving zombies musing that the Savage Land was their 'number one' meal in the aftermath, as it contained such an abundance of food that they were actually full for a full hour after eating there, as opposed to the usual ravenous hunger they feel. It is also the location of the final battle between the zombies and 'New Avengers' - three zombies who have beaten their hunger and the cyborg James Rhodes - at the storyline's conclusion, with Rhodes using one of his fingers to lure the zombies into an ambush.

Earth X
In the Earth X universe, the Savage Land is where Magneto built his sanctuary called Sentinel City.

House of M
In the House of M reality created by an insane Scarlet Witch, the Savage Land was known as "Pangea". It is also known that Kevin Plunder has been granted political asylum in the United States for his human rights activism in this prehistoric land.

Marvel 2099
In the alternate future depicted in Marvel 2099, an alien attack floods much of the earth rendering the Savage Land the only habitable space. Thousands of refugees (including Miguel O'Hara and most of X-Nation and X-Men) make new homes here. It is not without its own dangers.

The Transformers
In the Transformers Marvel comics continuity, shortly after the Ark''' spacecraft crashed on Earth 4 million years before the present day, the computer aboard the Ark detected Shockwave landing on the prehistoric Savage Land. The Ark used the last of its capabilities to revive the five Autobot warriors by scanning the Savage Land's dominant lifeform: dinosaurs, and rebuild them into the Dinobots. The Dinobots fought Shockwave, a battle that ended in permanent stalemate when Snarl brought down the mountain that Shockwave stood upon, knocking all of them into a tar pit. They remained deactivated until the year 1984. Since the Dinobots' alt-mode forms resemble creatures that were long-extinct by 4 million years ago, the Savage Land provided author Bob Budiansky a way to explain this within the canon timeline.

Spider-Geddon
During the "Spider-Geddon" storyline, an alternate unidentified Earth has a version of Spider-Man that lives in the Savage Land and was raised by a tribe of giant spiders following an airplane crash. It was mentioned by Ka-Zar the Hunter to Wilson Fisk that his father killed the last of the Man-Apes.

Ultimate Marvel
In the Ultimate Marvel universe, the Savage Land is a large island somewhere in the southern hemisphere. It was originally said to have been created by Magneto, using theories and methods developed by Professor X, as the site for genetic experiments. Magneto's goal there was to create a new human race who would be less trouble to rule than the current one, that he decided to restart evolution from scratch, and control the process to his own specifications. As a result of this, at its current level of advancement, it has dinosaurs, and that Magneto has shown no further interest in advancing the evolution of the Savage Land. It has remained in its dinosaur state since the departure of Professor X. This story is later revealed as false (see below).

Magneto's original base was on the Savage Land. When it was destroyed in the first arc of Ultimate X-Men, the computer controlling the base gained self-awareness, and hijacked the genetic experiment project to create an army of nanotech-enhanced, zombie-like thralls. It planned to take over the world, but was stopped by Wolverine, Cyclops, and Kitty Pryde.

The Savage Land is now the home of Longshot, who managed to get there in a small boat which launched from Genosha. Longshot recently aided Magneto in breaking out of prison, and the two may be planning something.

In Ultimates 3, it is revealed that the dinosaurs were conjured by Scarlet Witch as a result of her reality warping abilities and not by Magneto's creation. The aboriginal inhabitants were wiped out and only a small tribe of survivors including Ka-Zar and Shanna remain.

The inhabitants help the Ultimates remove the last of Magneto's forces as of Ultimatum.

What If?
The Savage Land appears in a What If story where the Savage Land was terraforming and has taken over New York. Both Ka-Zar and Parnival sacrifice themselves to return New York to normal, with Shanna the only survivor of his "family".

Additionally, in the What If issues involving alternative outcomes to the Age of Ultron, a group composed of Wolverine, the Hulk, Peter Parker and a Ghost Rider venture to the Savage Land in order to prevent a Master Mold under the control of a future version of Ezekiel Stane from unleashing a wave of Stark armors on the world.

In other media
Television
 While not officially named, the Savage land appears in the 1967 Spider-Man animated series episode "Neptune's Nose Cone".
 The Savage Land appears in the 1981 Spider-Man animated series episode "The Hunter and the Hunted".
 The Savage Land appeared in X-Men. This version of the region is home to Mister Sinister's base.
 The Savage Land appears in The Super Hero Squad Show episode "Brouhaha at the World's Bottom!" This version of the region is home to a S.H.I.E.L.D. outpost.
 The Savage Land appears in Hulk and the Agents of S.M.A.S.H. The Savage Land appears in the Avengers Assemble episode "Savages".
 The Savage Land appears in the Ultimate Spider-Man episode "The Savage Spider-Man".

Film
 X-Men film series producer Hutch Parker stated that either Marvel or Fox may add Ka-Zar and/or the Savage Land to their film series.
 The Savage Land makes a cameo appearance in the Marvel Cinematic Universe (MCU) film Doctor Strange in the Multiverse of Madness (2022) as one of several alternate realities that Doctor Strange and America Chavez visit.

Video games
 The Savage Land appears as Wolverine's stage in X-Men: Children of the Atom. 
 The Savage Land appears as the first stage of X-Men.
 The Savage Land appears as a stage in X-Men 2: Clone Wars.
 The Savage Land appears as a stage in X-Men: Next Dimension.
 The Savage land appears in X-Men Legends II: Rise of Apocalypse. This version of the region is home to the Brotherhood of Mutants' field base, Avalon.
 The Savage Land appears in Marvel Super Hero Squad.
 The Savage Land appears in Marvel: Avengers Alliance''.

See also
 Caprona (island)
 Dinosaur Island
 Skartaris

References

External links
 Savage Land at Marvel.com
 Savage Land at Marvel Directory
 Savage Land at Marvel Wiki
 Savage Land at Comic Vine

1965 in comics
X-Men
Dinosaurs in comic books
Fictional populated places in Antarctica
Lost world comics
Prehistoric life in popular culture
Marvel Comics locations